Gloria Totten is a nonprofit executive. She is the founder and president of the Public Leadership Institute, a nonprofit group that develops model legislation designed to protect access to legalized abortion. Totten previously worked at Progressive Majority from 2001-2015, served as political director of NARAL from 1996-2001, and was the Executive Director for Maryland's state chapter of NARAL from 1993-1996. She also he worked as the education director for Pro-Choice Resources, president and lobbyist for the Minnesota Coalition Against Sexual Assault, and media chair for It's Time Minnesota!

Totten serves as chair of the board of directors for Brave New Films and as a board member for the New American Leaders Initiative. She is an advisory committee member for the Drum Major Institute Scholars Program, Political Parity, ProgressNow, Wellstone Action, and the Women's Information Network.

References

External links
 Public Leadership Institute
 Gloria Totten on C-SPAN

Year of birth missing (living people)
Living people
American abortion-rights activists
People from Minnesota